Marin Boulevard is a station on the Hudson-Bergen Light Rail (HBLR) located south of Grand Street in the Liberty Harbor neighborhood of Jersey City, New Jersey.

The station opened on April 15, 2000. Northbound service from the station is available to Hoboken Terminal and Tonnelle Avenue in North Bergen. Southbound service is available to West Side Avenue in Jersey City and 22nd Street in Bayonne. Connection to PATH trains to midtown Manhattan and to New Jersey Transit commuter train service are available at Hoboken Terminal. Transfers to PATH trains to Newark, Harrison, and downtown Manhattan are available at Exchange Place.

Station layout

Gallery

References

External links
Station details
New Jersey Transit - Light Rail
Hudson-Bergen Light Rail schedule (PDF)
Station Photos
Platforms from Google Maps Street View

Hudson-Bergen Light Rail stations
Transportation in Jersey City, New Jersey
Railway stations in the United States opened in 2000
2000 establishments in New Jersey